Jessica Claire Pugh (born 29 May 1985) is an Australian politician. She has been the Labor member for Mount Ommaney in the Queensland Legislative Assembly since the 2017 Queensland election.

Early life and education

Born in Brisbane, Pugh attended Cannon Hill Anglican College and she has a Bachelor of Business from the Queensland University of Technology majoring in International Business and Management.

Career

After graduating in 2007, Pugh worked in the role of Ministerial Adviser in Disability Services, Local Government and Main Roads until 2011. She left to work as an events manager of Restaurant Two, a fine dining institution headed by her father, renowned restaurateur David Pugh, until the restaurant closed in December 2016.

Pugh served as a volunteer in numerous entities such as Queensland Meals on Wheels and Indooroopilly Montessori Children's House. Currently, she is serving as the President of the Centenary Ambulance Committee Branch and as a member of the Sumner Park Rotary Club.

Politics 
Pugh unsuccessfully contested the seat of Mount Ommaney in the 2015 Queensland state election.

Personal life

Pugh was married to Hugh O'Connell (2009–2018) and has two children.

She is married to Talbot Speechley (2020)

References

Parliamentary Profile

1985 births
Living people
Members of the Queensland Legislative Assembly
Australian Labor Party members of the Parliament of Queensland
Women members of the Queensland Legislative Assembly
21st-century Australian politicians
21st-century Australian women politicians